Kaarel Lukk (also Karl Michael Lukk; 6 December 1887 – 17 November 1970) was an Estonian racewalker and politician. He competed in the men's 10 kilometres walk at the 1912 Summer Olympics for the Russian Empire.

He was a member of Estonian Constituent Assembly.

References

External links
 

1887 births
1970 deaths
Politicians from Tartu
People from Kreis Dorpat
Estonian Social Democratic Workers' Party politicians
Members of the Estonian Constituent Assembly
Athletes (track and field) at the 1912 Summer Olympics
Estonian male racewalkers
Olympic competitors for the Russian Empire